CANSEC is Canada's global defence and security trade show hosted annually in Ottawa since 1998. It is hosted by the Canadian Association of Defence and Security Industries (CADSI), the national industry voice of more than 800 Canadian defence and security companies. The two-day event showcases leading-edge technology, products and services for land-based, naval, aerospace and joint forces military units.

Over the years, CANSEC has grown to a global show that welcomes over 11,000 registrants from Canada and abroad to see first-hand Canadian goods and technologies sought the world over. 

CANSEC 2009 occurred at Lansdowne Park in the city of Ottawa. The event lasted 2 days and was a showcase of next generation military and police equipment. The event took place after the Mayor of Ottawa allowed a ban preventing military and police trade shows to take place on city property to expire, clearing the way for the show. The show occupied the three major buildings at Lansdowne Park and had a permanent police presence to discourage protesters and vandals. There were no serious incidents during the shows run, with protesters being kept off city property by private security and police. Protesters largely disbanded due to weather conditions and lack of shelter from the rain.

CANSEC 2010 took place at Lansdowne Park in the city of Ottawa from June 2 to 3. The event increased in size with the use of the Aberdeen Pavilion, Civic Center and Coliseum Building as well as a tented outdoor exhibit. Heavy rain during the event kept the protest much smaller as well as seemingly less notification of the upcoming event. Numerous members of the Canadian Forces were present at the event as well as guest speakers including Peter McKay. There were exhibits set up by Boeing, Lockheed Martin, Raytheon, DRS Technologies, and General Dynamics.

References

Arms fairs